Neuwiller (Alsatian and Basel German: Näiwil) is a commune in the Haut-Rhin department in Alsace in north-eastern France. It is surrounded to the north, east and south by the Swiss canton of Basel-Landschaft, and is roughly 7 km from Basel itself.

See also
 Communes of the Haut-Rhin department

Formally known as Linienhausen.

References

External links

 Porte du Sundgau - Services de Neuwiller 
 Eurodistrict Basel 

Formally known as Linienhausen.

Communes of Haut-Rhin